Robert Raymond (born August 7, 1985) is a Canadian professional ice hockey defenceman. He is currently playing for Brûleurs de Loups of the Ligue Magnus (FRA).

Playing career
Raymond attended the Rochester Institute of Technology where he played four seasons of NCAA Division I college hockey with the RIT Tigers men's ice hockey team.

He played for the Charlotte Checkers of the American Hockey League (AHL) on loan from the Florida Everblades of the ECHL during the 2012–13 season.

On June 14, 2013, Raymond signed a one-year contract as a free agent abroad in Germany with the Iserlohn Roosters of the DEL. In the 2013–14 season with the Roosters, Raymond was a fixture on the blueline and compiled a productive 27 points in 52 games. After a post-season exit in the first round of the playoffs, Raymond announced signing a one-year contract with fellow DEL competitors, Adler Mannheim on April 4, 2014.

In his only season with Mannheim in 2014–15, Raymond suffered a dip in his offensive production from the blueline however helped the club to win 6th Championship in franchise history. On June 16, 2015, Raymond opted to return to the Iserlohn Roosters on a one-year contract. He enjoyed another productive season, with 27 points including 12 goals, tied for league lead for most goals by a defenseman.

After three seasons in Germany, Raymond left as a free agent to sign in the Neighboring Austrian EBEL with reigning Champions, EC Red Bull Salzburg, on a one-year deal on June 10, 2016.

On July 4, 2019 Raymond returned for his third stint in the DEL with Iserlohn, signing a two-year contract with the Roosters. Prior to the 2019–20 season, Raymond was announced as team captain.

Career statistics

Awards and honours

References

External links

1985 births
Living people
Adler Mannheim players
Binghamton Senators players
Brûleurs de Loups players
Canadian ice hockey defencemen
Charlotte Checkers (2010–) players
Florida Everblades players
Iserlohn Roosters players
Löwen Frankfurt players
RIT Tigers men's ice hockey players
EC Red Bull Salzburg players